Nathan Earle (born 4 June 1988) is an Australian cyclist, who currently rides for UCI Continental team .

Career
He transferred to Australian team  for the 2016 season. He then transferred to the Japanese  for the 2017 season. In October 2017 the  team announced that Earle would join them from 2018 on a two-year deal, with a focus on working as a domestique for Ben Hermans and Rubén Plaza.

He rejoined  for the 2020 season.

Earle currently holds the third fastest 'Everesting' time, completed in October 2020.

Major results

2010
 10th Overall Tour of Wellington
2011
 5th Overall Tour of Wellington
1st Stages 2, 3 & 4
 7th Coppa della Pace – Trofeo F.lli Anelli
 9th Trofeo Alcide Degasperi
2012
 1st Stage 3 Mersey Valley Tour
 2nd Overall Tour de Borneo
1st  Mountains classification
1st Stages 2 & 4
2013
 1st  Overall New Zealand Cycle Classic
1st Stages 2 & 4
 1st  Overall Tour of Toowoomba
1st Stages 2 & 3 (TTT)
 1st  Overall Santos North West Tour
1st Stage 4
 1st Stage 3 Tour de Perth
 3rd Overall Tour de Kumano
 5th Overall Tour de Taiwan
1st Stage 2
 5th Overall Tour de Borneo
 9th Overall Tour of Japan
1st Stage 5
2016
 10th Overall Tour de Taiwan
2017
 1st  Overall Tour de Lombok
1st  Mountains classification
1st  Sprints classification
1st Stages 1 & 2
 1st  Mountains classification Tour of Thailand
 2nd Overall Tour of Japan
 5th Road race, National Road Championships
 8th Overall Herald Sun Tour
 10th Overall Tour de Filipinas
2018
 6th Overall Vuelta a Asturias
2019
 4th Overall Tour de Taiwan
2022 
 1st  Overall Tour of Japan
1st Stage 1
 1st  Overall Tour de Kumano
 Tour of Thailand
1st  Mountains classification
1st Stage 6

References

External links
 Nathan Earle profile at Team Sky

1988 births
Living people
Australian male cyclists
Place of birth missing (living people)